Iphitus is a genus of  small sea snails, marine gastropods in the family Epitoniidae of the superfamily Epitonioidea, the wentletraps, the purple snails, and their allies.

Species
Species within the genus Iphitus include:
 Iphitus boucheti Poppe & Tagaro, 2016
 Iphitus cancellatus Dautzenberg & H. Fischer, 1896
 Iphitus clarki L. G. Brown, 2019
 Iphitus escondida Poppe & Tagaro, 2016
 Iphitus neozelanicus (Dell, 1956)
 Iphitus notios Pimenta, Andrade & Absalão, 2018
 Iphitus robertsi Sabelli & Taviani, 1997
 Iphitus tenuisculptus (Seguenza, 1876)
 Iphitus tuberatus Jeffreys, 1883
 Iphitus wareni L. G. Brown, 2019
Species brought into synonymy
 Iphitus marshalli (Sykes, 1925): synonym of Iphitus tenuisculptus (Seguenza, 1876)
 Iphitus reticulatus Dall, 1927: synonym of Iphitus cancellatus Dautzenberg & H. Fischer, 1896
 Iphitus tenerrimus Dautzenberg & Fischer H., 1896: synonym of Alora tenerrima (Dautzenberg & H. Fischer, 1896)
 Iphitus tuberculatus Watson, 1886: synonym of Sansonia tuberculata (Watson, 1886)

References

 Marinespecies

External links
 Jeffreys J.G. 1883. On the Mollusca procured during the 'Lightning' and 'Porcupine' expeditions 1868-70. (Part VI). Proceedings of the Zoological Society of London, 1882: 88-149, pl. 19, 20
 Beu, A. G.; Climo, F. M. (1974). Mollusca from a recent coral community in Palliser Bay, Cook Strait. New Zealand Journal of Marine and Freshwater Research. 8(2): 307-332
 https://doi.org/10.11646/zootaxa.3907.1.1
 Bouchet, P. & Warén, A. (1986). Revision of the Northeast Atlantic bathyal and abyssal Aclididae Eulimidae, Epitonidae (Mollusca, Gastropoda). Bollettino Malacologico. suppl. 2: 297-576
  Serge GOFAS, Ángel A. LUQUE, Joan Daniel OLIVER,José TEMPLADO & Alberto SERRA (2021) - The Mollusca of Galicia Bank (NE Atlantic Ocean); European Journal of Taxonomy 785: 1–114

Epitoniidae
Gastropod genera